"In My Lonely Room" is a 1964 single by Motown girl group Martha and the Vandellas. In this song, which registered at  #6 R&B (Cashbox) and #44 Pop, the narrator solemnly discusses how her lover's flirting with other girls leave her so depressed that all she can do was sit by "(her) lonely room and cry". The song was produced under a more solemn though still uptempo gospel-influenced number that had been on a number of the group's hits starting with "(Love Is Like a) Heat Wave". It was their fifth hit with Holland–Dozier–Holland.

Cash Box described it as "a real happy thumper geared for loads of spins and sales" that is performed in an "exciting infectious fashion."

Personnel
Lead vocals by Martha Reeves
Background vocals by Rosalind Ashford and Annette Beard
Produced by Brian Holland and Lamont Dozier
Written by Brian Holland, Lamont Dozier and Edward Holland, Jr.
Instrumentation by the Funk Brothers:
Richard "Pistol" Allen: drums
Jack Ashford: vibes
Henry Cosby: tenor saxophone
Mike Terry: baritone saxophone solo
James Jamerson: bass guitar
Robert White: guitar
Eddie Willis: guitar
Earl Van Dyke: piano

Other recordings

The Action recorded their version in 1965, produced by George Martin.
The Supremes recorded a version of the song to the same instrumental track as The Vandellas with additional instrumentation in 1966. It was produced by Holland-Dozier and intended to be included on their album The Supremes A' Go-Go, but remained unreleased until 1998.
Phil Collins recorded a version of the song for his album of soul covers, Going Back.

References

1964 songs
1964 singles
Martha and the Vandellas songs
The Supremes songs
Songs written by Holland–Dozier–Holland
Song recordings produced by Brian Holland
Song recordings produced by Lamont Dozier
Motown singles
Gordy Records singles